Mouettes Genevoises Navigation is a private water bus operator in Geneva, Switzerland, operating four lines across the western end of Lake Geneva. A member of the integrated Unireso fare network, its head office is in Geneva. The modern company was founded in 1897 by the merger of three boat operators.

Name 
"Mouettes" translates to "gulls". The origin of this name is not well understood, but may date from an era of many boat companies, each named after different birds. The boats today are usually painted in yellow and red, the heraldic colors of Geneva.

Lines 

The four lines are considered integral to the city's transport network and thus receive public funding.
 M1 Line  Pâquis – Molard
 M2 Line  Pâquis – Quai Gustave Ador
 M3 Line  Pâquis – Geneva beach
 M4 Line  Geneva beach – De-Chateaubriand

References

External links

 Mouettes Genevoises

Public transport in Switzerland
Organisations based in Geneva
Transport in Geneva